Dunfermline Rugby Football Club is a rugby union club based in Dunfermline, Fife, Scotland.

History

Established in 1893, home games are played at McKane Park.

Their strip is royal blue and white.

Honours

Men's

 Edinburgh Charity Sevens
 Champions (2): 1931, 1938
 Lanarkshire Sevens
 Champions (2): 1969, 1974
 Glasgow HSFP Sevens
 Champions (1): 1929
 St. Andrews University Sevens
 Champions (1): 1970
 Crieff Sevens
 Champions (1): 1994
 Hillfoots Sevens
 Champions (1): 1979
 Alloa Sevens
 Champions (1): 1938
 Glenrothes Sevens
 Champions (3): 1986, 1987, 1988
 Midlands District Sevens
 Champions (11): 1925, 1928, 1966, 1967, 1969, 1971, 1973, 1974, 1975, 1979, 1986
 Musselburgh Sevens
 Champions (2): 1967, 1975
 Kirkcaldy Sevens
 Champions (7): 1967, 1969, 1973, 1986, 1987, 1991, 2019

Notable players

Scotland internationalists

The following former Dunfermline players have represented Scotland at full international level.

Notable non-Scottish players

The following is a list of notable non-Scottish international representative former Glasgow players:

North and Midlands

The following former Dunfermline players have represented North and Midlands at provincial level.

Glasgow Warriors

The following former Dunfermline players have represented Glasgow Warriors at professional level.

Edinburgh Rugby

 Murray McCallum - Edinburgh Rugby
 Fraser McKenzie - Edinburgh Rugby, Sale Sharks, Newcastle Falcons

Notable outside of rugby

 Michael Woodhouse, New Zealand Member of Parliament and Deputy Leader of the House

See also
 Glenrothes RFC
 Howe of Fife RFC
 Kirkcaldy RFC

References

Sources

 Godwin, Terry Complete Who's Who of International Rugby (Cassell, 1987)
 Jones, J.R. Encyclopedia of Rugby Union Football (Robert Hale, London, 1976 )
 Massie, Allan A Portrait of Scottish Rugby (Polygon, Edinburgh)

Rugby clubs established in 1893
Scottish rugby union teams
Dunfermline
1893 establishments in Scotland
Rugby union in Fife